Bowlsby–Degelleke House is located in Parsippany–Troy Hills, Morris County, New Jersey, United States. The house was built in 1790 and added to the National Register of Historic Places on December 15, 1978.

See also
National Register of Historic Places listings in Morris County, New Jersey

References

Houses on the National Register of Historic Places in New Jersey
Houses completed in 1790
Houses in Morris County, New Jersey
National Register of Historic Places in Morris County, New Jersey
Parsippany-Troy Hills, New Jersey
New Jersey Register of Historic Places